Paul Wilhelm Schmiedel (December 22, 1851 – April 10, 1935) was a German theologian and professor of New Testament exegesis born in Zaukeroda (Zauckerode, now a part of Freital, Saxony) near Dresden.

He studied theology in Jena, where he had as instructors Otto Pfleiderer (1839–1908) and Richard Adelbert Lipsius (1830–1892). In 1879 he received his habilitation, and from 1893 to 1923 was a full professor at the University of Zurich.

Schmiedel was the author of "The Johannine Writings" (translated into English in 1908) and an 1894 revision of Georg Benedikt Winer's Grammatik des neutestamentlichen Sprachidioms. He also made important contributions to the Encyclopaedia Biblica.

References
  translated biography @ Biographisch-Bibliographisches Kirchenlexikon

External links
 
 Johannine Writings by Maurice A. Canney

1851 births
1935 deaths
People from Freital
People from the Kingdom of Saxony
20th-century German Protestant theologians
Academic staff of the University of Zurich
German male non-fiction writers